Rocky Hill is a borough in Somerset County, New Jersey, United States, named for the Rocky Hill Ridge.

As of the 2010 United States Census, the rural borough's population was 682, reflecting an increase of 20 (+3.0%) from the 662 counted in the 2000 Census. This was a decline of 31 persons (−4.5%) from the 693 counted in the 1990 Census.

History

The earliest European settlement in the area began after John Harrison negotiated the purchase of land in 1701 from the Lenni Lenape Native Americans who had long occupied the area. In 1783, during the American Revolutionary War, General George Washington camped at Rockingham, the house owned by the Berrien family; he would pass through the area again in 1789 on his way to New York City for his inauguration as President of the United States. Before roads were improved and people traveled by automobiles, it was known as the Devil's Featherbed because it was difficult to travel the rocky terrain by horse and wagon.

Rocky Hill was incorporated as a borough by an act of the New Jersey Legislature on December 18, 1889, from portions of Montgomery Township, based on the results of a referendum held four days earlier.

Geography

According to the United States Census Bureau, the borough had a total area of 0.61 square miles (1.59 km2), including 0.61 square miles (1.58 km2) of land and <0.01 square miles (0.01 km2) of water (0.49%). A large portion of Rocky Hill is taken up by Van Horne Park.

The borough borders the Somerset County municipalities of Franklin Township and Montgomery Township.

Ecology
According to the A. W. Kuchler U.S. potential natural vegetation types, Rocky Hill, New Jersey would have an Appalachian Oak (104) vegetation type with an Eastern Hardwood Forest (25) vegetation form.

Demographics

Census 2010

The Census Bureau's 2006–2010 American Community Survey showed that (in 2010 inflation-adjusted dollars) median household income was $88,929 (with a margin of error of +/− $14,448) and the median family income was $102,917 (+/− $21,668). Males had a median income of $88,333 (+/− $16,491) versus $57,083 (+/− $7,607) for females. The per capita income for the borough was $47,582 (+/− $7,276). About none of families and 3.3% of the population were below the poverty line, including none of those under age 18 and none of those age 65 or over.

Census 2000
As of the 2000 United States Census there were 662 people, 284 households, and 189 families residing in the borough. The population density was 982.0 people per square mile (381.5/km2). There were 295 housing units at an average density of 437.6 per square mile (170.0/km2). The racial makeup of the borough was 95.17% White, 1.36% African American, 0.45% Asian, 0.60% Pacific Islander, 0.91% from other races, and 1.51% from two or more races. Hispanic or Latino of any race were 3.93% of the population.

There were 284 households, out of which 24.3% had children under the age of 18 living with them, 60.9% were married couples living together, 4.9% had a female householder with no husband present, and 33.1% were non-families. 27.8% of all households were made up of individuals, and 12.7% had someone living alone who was 65 years of age or older. The average household size was 2.33 and the average family size was 2.82.

In the borough the population was spread out, with 20.2% under the age of 18, 3.3% from 18 to 24, 28.1% from 25 to 44, 31.1% from 45 to 64, and 17.2% who were 65 years of age or older. The median age was 44 years. For every 100 females, there were 98.2 males. For every 100 females age 18 and over, there were 95.6 males.

The median income for a household in the borough was $79,469, and the median income for a family was $100,314. Males had a median income of $54,375 versus $50,357 for females. The per capita income for the borough was $48,357. About 2.5% of families and 2.7% of the population were below the poverty line, including 1.8% of those under age 18 and 5.3% of those age 65 or over.

Government

Local government
Rocky Hill is governed under the Borough form of New Jersey municipal government, which is used in 218 municipalities (of the 564) statewide, making it the most common form of government in New Jersey. The governing body is comprised of the Mayor and the Borough Council, with all positions elected at-large on a partisan basis as part of the November general election. The Mayor is elected directly by the voters to a four-year term of office. The Borough Council is comprised of six members elected to serve three-year terms on a staggered basis, with two seats coming up for election each year in a three-year cycle. The Borough form of government used by Rocky Hill is a "weak mayor / strong council" government, in which council members act as the legislative body. The mayor presides at meetings and votes only in the event of a tie. The mayor can veto ordinances subject to an override by a two-thirds majority vote of the council. The mayor makes committee and liaison assignments for council members, and most appointments are made by the mayor with the advice and consent of the council.

, the Mayor of Rocky Hill is Democrat Robert Uhrik, whose term of office ends December 31, 2022. Members of the Borough Council are Council President Edgar L. "Trey" Delaney (D, 2024), Susan P. Bristol (I, 2023), Jonathan Lee (D, 2022; appointed to serve an unexpired term), Catherine Plunkett (D, 2022), Ken Rizzi (D, 2023; appointed to serve an unexpired term), Denise Varga (D, 2024).

In January 2022, the Borough Council selected Jonathan Lee from a list of three candidates nominated by the Democratic municipal committee to fill the seat expiring in December 2022 that had been held by Rasheeda Pretto until she resigned from office.

Rasheeda Pretto was appointed to fill the Borough Council seat expiring in December 2020 that had been held by Robert Uhrik until he stepped down to take office as mayor, though she chose to run for a full three-year term rather than to run for the remainder of the term. In November 2019, Amy Kirtland won a write-in campaign to fill the balance of Uhrik's council term.

At the January 2015 Reorganization Meeting, the Borough Council selected Robert Ashbaugh to fill the vacant seat expiring in December 2015 of Jeffrey Donohue, who vacated the seat when he took office as mayor.

Federal, state, and county representation
Rocky Hill is located in the 12th Congressional District and is part of New Jersey's 16th state legislative district

 

Somerset County is governed by a five-member Board of County Commissioners, whose members are elected at-large to three-year terms of office on a staggered basis, with one or two seats coming up for election each year. At an annual reorganization meeting held on the first Friday of January, the board selects a Director and Deputy Director from among its members. , Somerset County's County Commissioners are
Director Shanel Robinson (D, Franklin Township, term as commissioner ends December 31, 2024; term as director ends 2022),
Deputy Director Melonie Marano (D, Green Brook Township, term as commissioner and as deputy director ends 2022),
Paul Drake (D, Hillsborough Township, 2023),
Douglas Singleterry (D, North Plainfield, 2023) and 
Sara Sooy (D, Basking Ridge in Bernards Township, 2024).
Pursuant to Article VII Section II of the New Jersey State Constitution, each county in New Jersey is required to have three elected administrative officials known as constitutional officers. These officers are the County Clerk and County Surrogate (both elected for five-year terms of office) and the County Sheriff (elected for a three-year term). Constitutional officers, elected on a countywide basis are 
County Clerk Steve Peter (D, Somerville, 2022),
Sheriff Darrin Russo (D, Franklin Township, 2022) and 
Surrogate Bernice "Tina" Jalloh (D, Franklin Township, 2025)

Politics
Rocky Hill is considered to be the most Democratic-leaning municipality in Somerset County. It was Democratic in 2004 when most of the area was not, but like other municipalities in the region, it shifted further to the left since then, giving Joe Biden a plurality of more than 50% in the 2020 presidential election.

As of March 23, 2011, there were a total of 527 registered voters in Rocky Hill, of which 183 (34.7% vs. 26.0% countywide) were registered as Democrats, 190 (36.1% vs. 25.7%) were registered as Republicans and 151 (28.7% vs. 48.2%) were registered as Unaffiliated. There were 3 voters registered to other parties. Among the borough's 2010 Census population, 77.3% (vs. 60.4% in Somerset County) were registered to vote, including 100% of those ages 18 and over (vs. 80.4% countywide).

In the 2012 presidential election, Democrat Barack Obama received 63.6% of the vote (252 cast), ahead of Republican Mitt Romney with 34.6% (137 votes), and other candidates with 1.8% (7 votes), among the 397 ballots cast by the borough's 532 registered voters (1 ballot was spoiled), for a turnout of 74.6%. In the 2008 presidential election, Democrat Barack Obama received 258 votes (61.0% vs. 52.1% countywide), ahead of Republican John McCain with 154 votes (36.4% vs. 46.1%) and other candidates with 8 votes (1.9% vs. 1.1%), among the 423 ballots cast by the borough's 511 registered voters, for a turnout of 82.8% (vs. 78.7% in Somerset County). In the 2004 presidential election, Democrat John Kerry received 241 votes (56.3% vs. 47.2% countywide), ahead of Republican George W. Bush with 181 votes (42.3% vs. 51.5%) and other candidates with 6 votes (1.4% vs. 0.9%), among the 428 ballots cast by the borough's 501 registered voters, for a turnout of 85.4% (vs. 81.7% in the whole county).

In the 2013 gubernatorial election, Republican Chris Christie received 54.0% of the vote (150 cast), ahead of Democrat Barbara Buono with 42.8% (119 votes), and other candidates with 3.2% (9 votes), among the 282 ballots cast by the borough's 535 registered voters (4 ballots were spoiled), for a turnout of 52.7%. In the 2009 gubernatorial election, Republican Chris Christie received 153 votes (50.2% vs. 55.8% countywide), ahead of Democrat Jon Corzine with 122 votes (40.0% vs. 34.1%), Independent Chris Daggett with 23 votes (7.5% vs. 8.7%) and other candidates with 2 votes (0.7% vs. 0.7%), among the 305 ballots cast by the borough's 522 registered voters, yielding a 58.4% turnout (vs. 52.5% in the county).

Education
The Montgomery Township School District is a comprehensive public school district, consisting of five school facilities in Montgomery Township, that serves students in pre-kindergarten through twelfth grade from both Montgomery Township and Rocky Hill. As of the 2020–2021 school year, the district, comprised of five schools, had an enrollment of 4,498 students and 403.1 classroom teachers (on an FTE basis), for a student–teacher ratio of 11.2:1. Schools in the district (with 2020–2021 enrollment data from the National Center for Education Statistics) are 
Orchard Hill Elementary School with 727 students in grades Pre-K–2, 
Village Elementary School with 634 students in grades 3–4, 
Montgomery Lower Middle School with 743 students in grades 5–6, 
Montgomery Upper Middle School with 776 students in grades 7–8 and 
Montgomery High School with 1,577 students in grades 9–12. Rocky Hill had been a non-operating school district that had sent all of its students to the Montgomery Township School District,  as part of a sending/receiving relationship. With the termination of the non-operating district, Rocky Hill operates as part of the Montgomery district.

Rocky Hill is home to the Rocky Hill Cooperative Nursery School, which was established in 1957.

Transportation

Roads and highways

The major road that passes through is County Route 518, which runs for  through the borough and provides access to U.S. Route 206 to the west and Route 27 to the east. The nearest limited access roads are at least 25 minutes away, such as Interstate 287, Interstate 295 and the New Jersey Turnpike (Interstate 95).

Airport
Princeton Airport, serving the neighboring borough of Princeton, is located in Montgomery Township, just west of Rocky Hill.

Emergency services
Police coverage is provided by the New Jersey State Police, from the Kingwood Station in Hunterdon County. Part-time coverage is provided by the South Bound Brook Police for traffic enforcement only.

Fire protection is offered by the Rocky Hill Hook & Ladder Co #1/Station 53 Fire.

Emergency Medical Services are provided by the Rocky Hill First Aid and Rescue Squad (53 Rescue), which had been temporarily decommissioned as of March 2011 by Resolution 2011–33. An aggressive recruitment and training program under new operational and executive leadership led to Rocky Hill First and Rescue Squad returning to full primary EMS coverage in October 2012, covering all shifts on a scramble basis and offering mutual aid to squads based in Franklin Township, Kingston, and Princeton.

Notable people 

People who were born in, residents of, or otherwise closely associated with Rocky Hill include:

 John Berrien (1711–1772), justice of the New Jersey Supreme Court and trustee of the College of New Jersey, now Princeton University
 John Berrien Jr. (1759–1815), army officer during the Revolutionary War
 John Macpherson Berrien (1781–1856), served as United States Attorney General and represented Georgia in the United States Senate
 Anthony Cassar (born 1996), freestyle wrestler who was the NCAA Division I champion
 Tom Malinowski (born 1965), diplomat and politician who represents New Jersey's 7th congressional district
 Stephen F. Voorhees (1878–1965), architect in practice in New York City from 1910 until 1959, who was president of the American Institute of Architects from 1935 to 1937.
 George Washington, stayed in Rockingham, the house of the Berrien family, in the late summer of 1783, while Congress was in session in Princeton

References

External links

 Rocky Hill Borough website
 Montgomery Township School District
 
 School Data for the Montgomery Township School District, National Center for Education Statistics
 Rocky Hill and Montgomery's hometown newspaper

 
1889 establishments in New Jersey
Borough form of New Jersey government
Boroughs in Somerset County, New Jersey
New Jersey District Factor Group none
Populated places established in 1889